Sons of Trinity (Italian: Trinità & Bambino... e adesso tocca a noi, also known as Trinity & Babyface and Trinity & Bambino: The Legend Lives On) is a 1995 Italian, Spanish and German international co-production spaghetti Western comedy film. Filmed in Almería, the desert region along the southern coast of Spain where Sergio Leone filmed many of the early Clint Eastwood westerns, Sons of Trinity is a continuation of the Trinity series starring Terence Hill and Bud Spencer, and it was directed and produced by the creators of the original films; Italo Zingarelli and Enzo Barboni. It was the last film directed by Enzo Barboni.

Plot summary 
The children of Trinity and Bambino bear the same names of their fathers and, like them, they get a job in a dusty town in the West. Trinity Junior is a bounty hunter prankster and womanizer, while Bambino, more gruff, is also the sheriff and the jailer. The quiet peace of the two, who plan to marry two beautiful girls, is interrupted by the arrival of two gangs, one Anglo, one Mexican, of horse stealing criminals in a small Mexican town.

Cast 
 Heath Kizzier: Trinity
 Keith Neubert: Bambino
 Yvonne De Bark: Bonita
 Fanny Cadeo: Scintilla
 Renato Scarpa: Pablo
 Ronald Nitschke: Sheriff
 Siegfried Rauch: Parker
 Renato D'Amore: Ramirez Primero
 Riccardo Pizzuti: Gunslinger
 Jack Taylor: Theopolis

References

External links
 
 

1995 films
Spaghetti Western films
1995 Western (genre) films
Films shot in Almería
Films scored by Stefano Mainetti
1990s Italian-language films
1990s English-language films
English-language Italian films
1990s Italian films